Chandrexa de Queixa is a larger municipality in Ourense (province) in the Galicia region of north-west Spain. It lies towards the north-east of Ourense Province.

References  

Municipalities in the Province of Ourense